Sterling Foster Black (September 12, 1924 – May 20, 1996) was an American lawyer and politician.

Biography
Born in Birmingham, Alabama, Black was the son of United States Supreme Court Associate Justice Hugo Black. Black served in the United States Army during World War II. Black went to the George Washington University, Dartmouth College, and the University of Arizona. He received his law degree from Columbia Law School. Black was also in the title insurance business in Los Alamos, New Mexico. He was a lawyer and had worked for the United States Atomic Energy Commission in Los Alamos, New Mexico. Black served in the New Mexico State Senate from 1960 to 1968 as a Democrat. He was an outspoken critic of United States involvement in the Vietnam War, and served as the New Mexico state chairman of peace candidate Eugene McCarthy's presidential campaign. Black died from cancer at his home in Albuquerque, New Mexico.

Notes

External links

1924 births
1996 deaths
Lawyers from Birmingham, Alabama
Politicians from Birmingham, Alabama
People from Los Alamos, New Mexico
Military personnel from Birmingham, Alabama
Dartmouth College alumni
University of Arizona alumni
George Washington University alumni
Columbia Law School alumni
Businesspeople from New Mexico
New Mexico lawyers
Democratic Party New Mexico state senators
20th-century American politicians
Deaths from cancer in New Mexico
Politicians from Albuquerque, New Mexico
United States Army personnel of World War II